Morecroft is a surname. Notable people with the surname include:

Edward Morecroft (died 1580), Canon of Windsor
Lauren Morecroft (born 1987), Australian rules footballer
Richard Morecroft (born 1956), English-born Australian television presenter